Diwan Bahadur Sir Calamur Viravalli Kumaraswami Sastri (19 July 1870 – 24 April 1934) was an Indian lawyer and Sanskrit scholar who served as a judge of the Madras High Court. Eminent lawyer and statesman C. P. Ramaswami Iyer was his brother-in-law.

Early life 

Kumaraswami Sastri was born in Madras in 1870, the eldest son of C. V. Sundara Sastri. Kumaraswami Sastri was the grandson of C. V. Runganada Sastri, polyglot and one of the first Indians to serve in the Madras Legislative Council. He had three brothers and a sister, Seethammal, who married Sir C. P. Ramaswami Iyer.

Kumaraswami Sastri graduated from the Presidency College and Law College, Madras, where he won the Elphinstone Thompson and Morehead Law scholarships. He also won the Innes Medal.

Career 

Sastri started his career as a lawyer of the Madras High Court in 1894. After serving as a lawyer, Sastri eventually became Judge of the Madras Small Causes Court. He was awarded the "Diwan Bahadur" title while serving as the District Judge of Berhampur in 1911.

In 1914, Sastri was appointed judge of the Madras High Court. He was a member of the infamous Sedition Committee also known as Rowlatt committee under Justice Rowlatt, which resulted in the infamous Rowlatt Act. He was knighted in the 1924 New Year Honours list.

Death 

Sastri died in Madras in 1934, aged 63.

Notes 

1870 births
1934 deaths
Presidency College, Chennai alumni
Knights Bachelor
Judges of the Madras High Court
Indian Knights Bachelor
Dewan Bahadurs
19th-century Indian lawyers
20th-century Indian judges